A dead mall (also known as a ghost mall, zombie mall, or abandoned mall) is a shopping mall with a high vacancy rate or a low consumer traffic level, or that is deteriorating in some manner.

Many malls in North America are considered "dead" (for the purposes of leasing) when they have no surviving anchor store or successor that could attract people to the mall.

Without the pedestrian traffic that department stores previously generated, sales volumes decline for almost all stores and rental revenues from those stores can no longer sustain the costly maintenance of the malls. Without good pedestrian access, smaller stores inside malls are difficult to reach.

Changes in the retail climate

Structural changes in the department-store industry have also made survival of these malls difficult. These changes have contributed to some areas or suburbs having insufficient traditional department stores to fill all the existing larger-lease-area anchor spaces. A few large national chains have replaced many local and regional chains, and some national chains are defunct.
 United States: Alexander's, Montgomery Ward, Woolworth's, Ames, Service Merchandise, Barneys New York, Mervyn's, Henri Bendel, Gottschalks, The Bon-Ton, Shopko, and Lord & Taylor are all defunct. Some brands such as Marshall Field's, Filene's, Stern's, and Hecht's were converted to Macy's. Sears and Kmart have closed almost all of their stores due to their declining sales. Other major department store chains such as Nordstrom, Macy's, Neiman Marcus, Saks Fifth Avenue and J.C. Penney have closed a good portion of their stores.
 Canada: Simpsons, Eaton's, Kmart, Target Canada, Woolco, Woodwards, Zellers and Sears Canada are all defunct. Eaton's was a partner in many malls so its bankruptcy and closure of these stores robbed many shopping centers of their anchor. Walmart once held a large presence in Canadian shopping malls after taking over the Woolco chain; however, most of these spaces were abandoned in favor of larger freestanding big-box stores. Zellers sold most of its store leases to Target Corporation, and the remaining Zellers stores were closed since it was not economically viable to service these remaining locations, which were far-flung and in less desirable areas. Target Canada closed all Canadian stores in 2015 and, unlike the other defunct stores, Target has no successor to lease their vacant space. Canadian Tire and Walmart have since acquired a number of Target locations.
 United Kingdom: Arcadia Group (which encompassed multiple British clothing brands), Allders, British Home Stores, Debenhams, Lewis's, Owen Owen, and Vergo Retail are all either defunct or sold to online retailers. Since the 2020 pandemic, more chains have suffered in the increasingly difficult British market, with chains such as Marks and Spencer announcing store closures.
 Australia: Grace Bros., Venture, Waltons, Mark Foy's, Foy & Gibson, Anthony Hordern's, Gowings, Nock & Kirby, Buckley & Nunn and Fosseys are defunct, however other reasoning for this is that some of these stores were bought out by other brands. The two remaining department stores in Australia, Myer and David Jones have closed a handful of under-performing stores, along with Target rapidly declining in stores. 

In the US and Canada, newer "big box" chains (also referred to as "category killers") such as Walmart, Target Corporation and Best Buy normally prefer purpose-built free-standing buildings rather than using mall-anchor spaces. 21st-century retailing trends favor open air lifestyle centers; which resemble elements of power centers, big box stores, and strip malls; and (most disruptively for storefronts) online shopping over indoor malls. The massive change led Newsweek to declare the indoor mall format obsolete in 2008. The year 2007 marked the first time since the 1950s that no new malls were built in the United States. Most Canadian malls still remain indoors after renovations due to the harsh winter climate throughout most of the country, however the Don Mills Centre was turned into an open-air shopping plaza. Attitudes about malls have also been changing. With changing priorities, people have less time to spend driving to and strolling through malls and, during the Great Recession, specialty stores offered what many shoppers saw as useless luxuries they could no longer afford. In this respect, big box stores and conventional strip malls have a time-saving advantage.

The number of dead malls has increased significantly because the economic health of malls across the United States has been in decline, with high vacancy rates in many of these malls. From 2006 to 2010, the percentage of malls that are considered to be "dying" by real estate experts (have a vacancy rate of at least 40%), unhealthy (20-40%), or in trouble (10-20%) all increased greatly, and these high vacancy rates only partially decreased from 2010 to 2014. In 2014, nearly 3% of all malls in the United States were considered to be "dying" (40% or higher vacancy rates) and nearly one-fifth of all malls had vacancy rates considered "troubling" (10% or higher).

Some real estate experts say the "fundamental problem" is a glut of malls in many parts of the country creating a market that is "extremely over-retailed". Cowen Research reported that the number of malls in the U.S. grew more than twice as fast as the population between 1970 and 2015; Cowen also reported that shopping center "gross leasable area" in the U.S. is 40 percent more shopping space per capita than Canada and five times more than the U.K.

Some malls have maintained profitability, particularly in areas with frequent inclement weather (or otherwise weather undesirable for outdoor activities, such as shopping in an open-air shopping/lifestyle center) or large populations of senior citizens who can partake in mall walking. Combined with lower rents, these factors have led to companies like Simon Malls enjoying high profits and occupancy averages of 92%. Some retailers have also begun to re-evaluate the mall environment, a positive sign for the industry.

A retail apocalypse that started in the 2010s made the dead mall situation even more noticeable, due to the complete closing of several retailers, as well as anchor tenants Macy's and J. C. Penney closing many locations and the sharp decline in Sears Holdings. The trend was particularly noticeable when Pittsburgh Mills, a mall once worth as much as $190 million, was sold at a foreclosure sale for $100, with the mall itself being purchased by lien holder Wells Fargo.

Demographic change
It has been suggested that some malls die when the surrounding neighborhoods undergo a demographic change or socio-economic decline.

History

COVID-19 pandemic 

The COVID-19 pandemic exacerbated many issues affecting malls. During the COVID-19 pandemic, many malls closed temporarily due to stay-at-home orders. A number of notable retailers filed for bankruptcy during the pandemic including Ascena Retail Group, Brooks Brothers, GNC, JCPenney, Lord & Taylor, and Neiman Marcus.

North American malls that have permanently closed citing the pandemic as a precipitating factor include Northgate Mall in Durham, North Carolina, Cascade Mall in Burlington, Washington, and the Metrocenter in Phoenix, Arizona.

Redevelopment
Dead malls are occasionally redeveloped. Leasing or management companies may change the architecture, layout, decor, or other component of a shopping center to attract more renters and draw more profits. Several dead malls have been significantly renovated into open-air shopping centers.

Redevelopment can involve a switch from retail usage to office or educational use for a building, such as is the case with Eastgate Metroplex in Tulsa, Oklahoma, Park Central Mall in Phoenix, Eastmont Town Center in Oakland, California, Windsor Park Mall in San Antonio (now the global headquarters of Rackspace), Global Mall at the Crossings in Nashville, Tennessee, and the Coral Springs Mall in Florida. Allegheny Center Mall, a retail mall just north of downtown Pittsburgh, Pennsylvania, closed as a retail mall in the early 1990s. The mall was successfully redeveloped into office space, but much of the space was taken by telecommunications carriers, data center operators, and Internet service providers, and is now a major carrier hotel serving southwestern Pennsylvania. Yet another use for a former mall can be seen in Lexington, Kentucky, where Lexington Mall was partially demolished and converted into a satellite worship center for a local megachurch.

Conversion from a shopping mall into an open-air, mixed-use area may entail the demolition of parts of or all of the former shopping mall. An example of this can be seen in Fairfax County, Virginia, where the old Springfield Mall was converted into Springfield Town Center, a mixed-use development that includes a 12-screen movie theatre, shops, and restaurants with outdoor seating and entrances. When the structures are demolished completely, it is known as a greyfield site. In jurisdictions such as Vermont (with a strict permitting process) or in major urban areas (where open fields are long gone), this greyfielding can be much easier and cheaper than building on a greenfield site. An example of this type of redevelopment is Prestonwood Town Center in Dallas and Voorhees Town Center in Voorhees Township, New Jersey.

Amazon, FedEx, DHL, UPS and the United States Postal Service have already acquired the sites of some failed malls and converted them to fulfillment centers. A proposal called "Re-Habit" uses portions of struggling malls, particularly vacated big box space, for homeless housing. As an example of this concept, the vacant Macy's in the Landmark Mall of Alexandria, Virginia has been converted into a temporary homeless shelter for the Carpenter's Shelter.

Some major healthcare systems such as Vanderbilt Health and the University of Rochester (UR) Health have converted several dying malls into new "health malls" or "mall to medicine." The large spaces allow for the easy conversion of space-intensive activities such as ambulatory surgical centers, while the multiple storefronts facilitate "one stop shopping" for all your health related needs, with specialists co-located with primary care, laboratories, pharmacies and more. Roughly half of 100 Oaks Mall in Nashville, TN is now dedicated to Vanderbilt University Medical Center. Following in Vanderbilt's successful model, it is expanding to other dead or dying malls throughout its region, while University of Rochester Medical Center is converting roughly one-third of The Marketplace Mall in Henrietta, NY.

See also
E-commerce
Jasper Mall (film)
Dan Bell

Modern ruins
Urban decay

Footnotes

Further reading

External links

Article about the Dead Malls Competition
Labelscar, Retail History

Defunct shopping malls
Shopping malls by type
Urban decay